The Wat Mahathat (Thai , Temple of the Great Relic) is a Buddhist temple in Ayutthaya, central Thailand.

Location 
The Wat Mahathat Ayutthaya is located in the center of old Ayutthaya, between Chi Kun Road and Naresuan Road in the northeast corner of Phra Ram Park.

Architecture 
According to the official Thai history, referring to the investigations of the Royal Chronicles of Ayutthaya by Prince Damrong Rajanubhab, the history of Wat Mahathat starts in 1374 when King Borommaracha I erected a temple at this place, bearing another name:"In the Year of the Tiger 736 C.S. Somdet Phra Borommarachathirat and Phra Mahathera Thammakanlayan built the great, glorious, holy, jewelled reliquary (Phra Si Rattana Mahathat) east of the palace (the Royal gable of the lion). He rose 19 wah in height and equipped with a nine-membered tip that is another 3 wah in height."His nephew and successor Ramesuan (1369-1370, 1388-1395) expanded the site in 1384 to build a great temple, while he was here as a monk between his throne offices. During this time the temple got its present name.

Mahathat